The 2013 GP2 Series season was the forty-seventh season of the second-tier of Formula One feeder championship and also ninth season under the GP2 Series moniker, a support series to the 2013 Formula One World Championship.

The 2013 season saw three new teams — Russian Time, Hilmer Motorsport and MP Motorsport — join the championship, replacing iSport International, Ocean Racing Technology and Scuderia Coloni. 2013 was scheduled to be the last season in which teams compete with the third-generation GP2 car — the Dallara GP2/11 — which was introduced in 2011, but series organisers decided to keep the GP2/11 for another three-year cycle in a bid to keep costs down.
The season saw 10 different winners. Champion Fabio Leimer took 3 race wins, as runner-up Sam Bird took 5 victories, Jolyon Palmer took 2 race wins, as did Jon Lancaster. Stefano Coletti took 3 sprint race wins. Adrian Quaife-Hobbs, Nathanael Berthon, Marcus Ericsson and Alexander Rossi each took 1 race win, and ART Grand Prix driver James Calado took 2 race wins.

Teams and drivers
Twenty-six drivers representing thirteen teams was scheduled to take part in the championship. The driver who is declared champion received a Formula One test with tyre supplier Pirelli as their prize, as well as qualifying for an FIA Superlicence.

Team changes
 After racing as «Lotus GP» in 2011 and 2012, ART Grand Prix reverted to using its original name in 2013.
 Scuderia Coloni did not participate in the 2013 season following what the team described as a "disagreement" between themselves and series organisers during the 2012 season. They were replaced by the Dutch team MP Motorsport.
 In February 2013, the owners of iSport International announced that the team had been put up for sale to avoid potential bankruptcy. The team was later purchased by Russian Time, a Russian entry based in Germany.
 Ocean Racing Technology withdrew from the GP2 Series (and sister series GP3) after encountering financial difficulty. They were replaced by Hilmer Motorsport, a team created by Franz Hilmer, whose company Formtech supplies several Formula One teams.

Driver changes
Entering/Re-entering GP2
 After finishing as runner-up in the 2012 GP3 Series with the Lotus GP team, Daniel Abt joined the team's GP2 squad, partnering James Calado.
 After one-year absence due to Formula Renault 3.5 campaign, Sam Bird returned to the series with Russian Time.
 Kevin Ceccon, who competed in the GP2 Series in 2011 with Scuderia Coloni, returned to GP2 with Trident Racing, having spent the 2012 season racing in GP3.
 GP3 Series driver Conor Daly made his debut with Hilmer Motorsport.
 2012 GP3 Series champion Mitch Evans entered the GP2 Series with Arden International, the same team he won the GP3 title with.
 2012 European F3 Open Copa Class champion Kevin Giovesi graduated to the GP2 Series with Venezuela GP Lazarus.
 Former HRT F1 test driver Ma Qinghua joined Caterham Racing after the collapse of HRT.
 2012 Auto GP World Series champion Adrian Quaife-Hobbs made his step up to GP2 with MP Motorsport.
 Pål Varhaug returned to GP2 after placing second in the Auto GP World Series in 2012.

Leaving GP2
 Max Chilton left GP2 to race in Formula One with Marussia.
 Luca Filippi left the GP2 Series to compete in IndyCar with Barracuda Racing.
 Esteban Gutiérrez left GP2 to race in Formula One with Sauber alongside 2009 champion Nico Hülkenberg.
 Nigel Melker, who raced in 2012 with Ocean Racing Technology, moved to the Formula Renault 3.5 Series for the 2013 season.
 2012 series runner-up Luiz Razia left Arden International to make his Formula One debut with Marussia. However, Razia lost his seat with the team less than a month later, and did not secure a seat in the GP2 Series.
 Davide Valsecchi, who won the 2012 championship with DAMS, left the series, as GP2 champions are not permitted to continue racing in the category. Valsecchi was later promoted to the role of test and reserve driver for Formula One team Lotus F1.
 Giedo van der Garde left the GP2 Series for Formula One, where he continued racing for Caterham.

Changed Teams
 Nathanaël Berthon left Racing Engineering after a single season. He later joined Trident Racing.
 Sergio Canamasas, who raced with Venezuela GP Lazarus in the second half of the 2012 season, joined Caterham Racing.
 Johnny Cecotto Jr. moved from Barwa Addax to Arden International.
 Daniël de Jong, who competed part-time with Rapax in 2012, joined MP Motorsport.
 Tom Dillmann, who also competed part-time with Rapax throughout the 2012 season, joined Russian Time.
 Marcus Ericsson left iSport International to join DAMS.
 Rio Haryanto, who drove for Carlin in 2012, moved to Barwa Addax for the 2013 season.
 Julián Leal switched to Racing Engineering after competing with Trident Racing during the 2012 season.
 Felipe Nasr, who drove for DAMS in 2012, moved to Carlin for the 2013 season.
 Jolyon Palmer switched from iSport International to Carlin.
 Stéphane Richelmi joined DAMS, after racing for Trident Racing in 2012.
 Ricardo Teixeira lost his seat at Rapax. He returned with Trident Racing for the Hungarian and Belgian rounds.
 Simon Trummer lost his seat at Arden International. He later moved to Rapax for the 2013 season.

Mid-season changes
 After the first round in Malaysia, Conor Daly was replaced by 2012 Formula Renault 3.5 Series champion Robin Frijns.
 Alexander Rossi replaced Ma Qinghua at Caterham Racing after the first round.
 Jon Lancaster replaced Pål Varhaug at Hilmer Motorsport after the second round.
 Fabrizio Crestani replaced Kevin Giovesi at Venezuela GP Lazarus ahead of the Silverstone round of the championship.
 Vittorio Ghirelli debuted in the series at the Hungaroring round replacing Crestani at Lazarus.
 Trident's driver Kevin Ceccon was replaced at the Hungarian round by Ricardo Teixeira.
 MP Motorsport driver Adrian Quaife-Hobbs moved teams to Hilmer at the Hungaroring, replacing Robin Frijns. Quaife-Hobbs was replaced at MP by series veteran Dani Clos.
 Frijns made a comeback replacing Lancaster at the Spa-Francorchamps event, before Lancaster returned at Monza.
 Auto GP World Series driver Sergio Campana was drafted in to replace Teixeira at Trident at Monza.
 Gianmarco Raimondo joined Trident ahead of the race in Singapore.

2013 schedule
The calendar for the 2013 series was unveiled on 19 December 2012. The season consisted of twenty-two races in support of eleven Formula One Grands Prix throughout the 2013 season.

Calendar changes
 The series only visited the Bahrain International Circuit once in 2013, in support of the 2013 Bahrain Grand Prix. The second, independent round—that was held one week after the 2012 Bahrain Grand Prix—was discontinued for 2013.
 The series did not visit the Valencia Street Circuit after the European Grand Prix was removed from the 2013 Formula One season calendar.
 The series returned to race the Yas Marina Circuit after the round was run as a non-championship race in 2011 and left off the 2012 calendar.
 German Grand Prix was moved from Hockenheim to Nürburgring.

Results and standings

Summary

Drivers' championship
Scoring system
Points were awarded to the top 10 classified finishers in the Feature race, and to the top 8 classified finishers in the Sprint race. The pole-sitter in the feature race also received four points, and two points were given to the driver who set the fastest lap inside the top ten in both the feature and sprint races. No extra points were awarded to the pole-sitter in the sprint race.

Feature race points

Sprint race points
Points were awarded to the top 8 classified finishers.

Notes:
† — Drivers did not finish the race, but were classified as they completed over 90% of the race distance.

Teams' championship

Notes:
† — Drivers did not finish the race, but were classified as they completed over 90% of the race distance.

Notes

References

External links
 GP2 Series official website

GP2 Series
GP2 Series seasons
GP2 Series